

Puhaddin (Puhading Mu, 普哈丁墓)

According to information at the tomb, Puhaddin (Puhading) was a 16th generation descendant of the Islamic prophet, Muhammad. The tomb is on the eastern bank of the (Old) Grand Canal in the eastern sector of Yangzhou, and is adjacent to a mosque that houses a collection of valuable materials documenting China's relations with Muslim countries. It was located inside a Ming Dynasty graveyard.

References

Islam in China